The 2004–05 Louisville Cardinals men's basketball team represented the University of Louisville during the 2004–05 NCAA Division I men's basketball season, Louisville's 91st season of intercollegiate competition. The Cardinals competed in Conference USA and were coached by Rick Pitino, who was in his fourth season.  The team played home games at Freedom Hall.

The Cardinals won the Conference USA tournament championship (their 2nd), defeating Memphis 75-74. Louisville defeated West Virginia 93-85 (OT) to win the NCAA Tournament Albuquerque Regional and advance to the Final Four (their 8th) where they fell to eventual runner-up Illinois 72-57.  The Cardinals finished with a 33-5 (14-2) record.

Roster

Schedule and results

|-
!colspan=9 style=| Regular season

|-
!colspan=9 style=| Conference USA Tournament

|-
!colspan=9 style=| NCAA Tournament

References

Louisville Cardinals men's basketball seasons
Louisville
NCAA Division I men's basketball tournament Final Four seasons
Louisville
Louisville Cardinals men's basketball, 2004-05
Louisville Cardinals men's basketball, 2004-05